Prelaryngeal lymph nodes are lymph nodes located anterior to the larynx.

One such node is the Delphian node situated above the isthmus of the thyroid gland, which may be removed at the time of a thyoidectomy as a sentinel lymph node in order to identify risks of cancer spread.

References

Lymphatics of the head and neck